Sharon File (born as Sharon File in 1958 in Eccles, Kent) is an English illustrator, designer, artist and author.

Life and work
From head girl at Aylesford School, Sharon attended Medway College of Design (now University for the Creative Arts), leaving in 1978 to work as designer for Bass Riley in Knightsbridge. After various roles as illustrator and/or designer for other London agencies including B L Kearley Ltd. in Chilton Street, she became Packaging Designer for Trebor Bassett.

During the mid-nineties, she attracted the attention of Aceville Publications Crafts Beautiful magazine and began providing projects and gained a reputation for re-cycling objects by decorating them with her distinctive painting style. This led to work from the same publishers in their Quick and Crafty! magazine (now discontinued).
Sharon's craft work has also been seen in Origins Quick Cards Made Easy and in the NSPCC title Your Family, published by Redwood in the UK.

Books (as Sharon Bennett)
 Crafters Design Library Christmas — David & Charles 
 Crafters Design Library Floral — David & Charles
 Crafters Design Library Animals — David & Charles
 Crafters Design Library Celebrations — David & Charles
 Crafters Design Library Fairies — David & Charles
 Crafters Design Library Men's Motifs — David & Charles

References

 https://web.archive.org/web/20101029155530/http://www.monstersandcritics.com/books/reviews/article_1460059.php/Book_Review_The_Crafter_s_Design_Library_Fairies_by_Sharon_Bennett
 https://www.amazon.co.uk/product-reviews/0715317482/ref=dp_top_cm_cr_acr_txt?ie=UTF8&showViewpoints=1

External links
 Sharon's Blog

English illustrators
Living people
1958 births
People from Tonbridge and Malling (district)
Alumni of the University for the Creative Arts